Anna Easteden (born 29 November 1976) is a Finnish-American actress. Her film appearances include The House of Branching Love  (2009) and Sideways  (2009). She is known for her performance as "Bee Sting" in Who Wants to Be a Superhero? season 2 (2007) on Sci Fi Channel. She co-starred in soap operas: Passions and Days of Our Lives on NBC, the television series Bones on Fox and Two and a Half Men on CBS.

Biography 

Easteden was born in Tohmajärvi, Finland, as Anna Katariina Shemeikka, the daughter of dairy farmers. She has a younger brother, Antti. Easteden was raised in Finland until her teenage years, excelling in public schools, and graduating youngest in her class.

Modeling career 

Easteden graduated from a Finnish modeling school at the age of 12 and shortly booked her first modeling job in Finland. She appeared in her first magazine cover after winning a national contest held by popular teen magazine SinäMinä (as Anna Shemeikka). 
 
Still a teenager, Anna Easteden received her first international modeling contract with a Japanese modeling agency and moved to Tokyo. In Tokyo she appeared in advertisements for companies such as: Kanebo, Sony, Nissan, Wacoal, Oricom, NEC and Lux. She was designer Akira Kimijima's house model and had an exclusive contract with a Japanese cosmetics company. Easteden also worked as a model in Hong Kong, Taiwan, Korea, Singapore, Malaysia, Indonesia, New Zealand, Slovakia, Guam and finally the United States. In the US, Anna Easteden has modeled for companies including: Avon, Salvatore Ferragamo, Calvin Klein, XOXO, Hermès, Diesel, Pony, T-Mobile, Toyo Tires, Michael Antonio, Jockey, Ashworth, Kohl's, Nissan, Victoria's Bridal, Gottschalks, Anna's Linens, PajamaGram, Rio Hotel, Marie Claire, Chevy, Sue Wong and Coffee Bean and Tea Leaf.

Acting career
Easteden started her acting career in TV commercials in Japan, Taiwan, and the United States. In her first play she was Sleeping Beauty in the play Sleeping Beauty, which premiered in Chicago, at the Downers Grove Tivoli Theater.

Easteden is known for her performance as supervillain "Beesting" from Who Wants to Be a Superhero?. Her other television roles include: Two and a Half Men, Bones, Passions, and Days of Our Lives.

Easteden is the host of Wipeout in Finland, that started airing in Finland on FOX in March 2013.

Humanitarian Work
Easteden conducted a comparative legal research study on the different aspects of asylum procedures in selected European countries for United Nations High Commissioner for Refugees (UNHCR) in Bratislava, Slovakia. Her research impacted the Slovak National Asylum Legislation, which was in the process of amendment. Easteden continued her work in Bratislava, with an international partner of The Foundation for a Civil Society (USA), where she was involved in the "Citizen Campaign "OK '98" for free and fair elections.

Personal life
Easteden married an American baseball coach, Rob McKinley, in 2007 and gave birth to their daughter Everett on February 23, 2018. They live in Los Angeles.

Filmography

Awards
In 2010, Easteden was nominated for Best Supporting Actress award at the Method Fest Independent Film Festival in Los Angeles, California.

References

External links 
 
 

1976 births
Living people
People from Tohmajärvi
American film actresses
American television actresses
Actresses from Los Angeles
American female models
American people of Finnish descent
Finnish expatriates in the United States
Finnish female models
Finnish television actresses
Finnish film actresses
American human rights activists
Women human rights activists
United Nations High Commissioner for Refugees Goodwill Ambassadors
Activists from California